The 2011–12 season of SV Wehen Wiesbaden began on 18 June with their first friendly match.

Review and events

Off-season
Wehen signed this year's captain Marco Christ from Fortuna Düsseldorf, as well as signing Nico Herzig and Thorsten Burkhardt from Alemannia Aachen, Aziz Bouhaddouz from FSV Frankfurt, Martin Abraham from SK Slavia Prague, Pascal Bieler from 1. FC Nürnberg all for free, and Daniel Brosinski from 1. FC Köln.

They sold last year's captain, Fabian Schönheim to 1. FSV Mainz 05 for €400K, and Daniel Brosinski (who they had signed in the same transfer window) to MSV Duisburg for €150K

Matches

3. Liga
The 2011–12 3. Liga began on 23 July when Wiesbaden played in the opening game of the season at home against SV Werder Bremen II.

Matches

Squad information

Goal scorers

All competitions

2011–12 3rd Liga

DFB-Pokal

|-  style="text-align:left; background:#dcdcdc;"
| colspan="12"|Last updated: 26 March 2012
|-

Reserve team

Wehen Wiesbaden's reserve team play in the fifth tier Hessenliga and are coached by Thomas Brendel.

Squad

References 

SV Wehen Wiesbaden seasons
Wehen Wiesbaden, Sv